This is a list of members of the Senate of Canada in the 35th Parliament of Canada.

The province of Quebec has 24 Senate divisions which are constitutionally mandated. In all other provinces, a Senate division is strictly an optional designation of the senator's own choosing, and has no real constitutional or legal standing. A senator who does not choose a special senate division is designated a senator for the province at large.

Names in bold indicate senators in the 26th Canadian Ministry.

List of senators

Senators at the beginning of the 35th Parliament

Senators appointed during the 35th Parliament

Left Senate during the 35th Parliament

Changes in party affiliation during the 35th Parliament
There were no changes in party affiliation during the 35th Parliament.

See also
List of current Canadian senators

References

35
Canadian parliaments
35th Canadian Parliament